Puneet Yadav (born 12 August 1987) is an Indian first-class cricketer who plays for Rajasthan.

References

External links
 

1987 births
Living people
Indian cricketers
Rajasthan cricketers
Cricketers from Jaipur